Wawonii (Wowoni) is an Austronesian language (one of the Celebic languages) of the Wawonii (Konawe Kepulauan Regency, Southeast Sulawesi) and Menui (in Morowali Regency, Central Sulawesi) islands of Indonesia. The language is quite close to the Bungku language.

References

Further reading
Mead, David. 1998. Proto-Bungku-Tolaki: Reconstruction of its phonology and aspects of its morphosyntax. PhD dissertation. Houston: Rice University.
Mead, David. 1999. The Bungku–Tolaki languages of south-eastern Sulawesi, Indonesia. Series D-91. Canberra: Pacific Linguistics.

Bungku–Tolaki languages
Languages of Sulawesi